The 2021 European Junior Taekwondo Championships, the 23rd edition of the European Junior Taekwondo Championships, will held in Sarajevo, Bosnia and Herzegovina at the Hotel Hills from 12 to 15 November 2021.

Medal summary

Men

Women

Medal table

References

External links 
Official website

European Junior Taekwondo Championships
European Junior Championships
International sports competitions hosted by Bosnia and Herzegovina
Taekwondo competitions
Taekwondo in Europe